Inter-City Baptist School is a Baptist school located in Allen Park, Michigan. It was opened in 1966 and includes students ranging from kindergarten to twelfth grade.

Demographics
As of the 2015–16 school year, Inter-City was 100% white.

Athletics
The Inter-City Baptist Chargers compete in the Michigan Independent Athletic Conference. The school colors are purple and gold. The following MHSAA sanctioned sports are offered:

Baseball (boys)
Basketball (girls and boys)
Golf (boys)
Soccer (girls and boys)
Softball (girls)
Volleyball (girls)

References

External links
 Official website

Baptist schools in the United States
Christian schools in Michigan
Schools in Wayne County, Michigan
1966 establishments in Michigan